Buch is a municipality in the canton of Schaffhausen in Switzerland.

History
Buch is first mentioned in 1080 when Gerolt von Buch appears as a witness in a document.

Coat of arms
The blazon of the municipal coat of arms is Gules an Orb Argent banded Or and crossed of the second.

Geography

Of this area, 74.7% is used for agricultural purposes, while 19.6% is forested. Of the rest of the land, 5.5% is settled (buildings or roads) and the remainder (0.3%) is non-productive (rivers, glaciers or mountains).

The municipality is located in the Stein district.  It is a farm village on the Biber river which empties into the Rhine.

Demographics
Buch has a population of 296, of which 20.3% are foreign nationals.  Of the foreign population,, 83.3% are from Germany, and 16.7% are from another country. Over the last 10 years the population has grown at a rate of 6.8%.  Most of the population speaks German (74.8%), with Turkish being second most common ( 5.3%) and Arabic being third ( 2.3%).

The age distribution of the population is children and teenagers (0–19 years old) make up 22% of the population, while adults (20–64 years old) make up 62.8% and seniors (over 64 years old) make up 15.2%.

In the 2007 federal election the most popular party was the SVP which received 65.4% of the vote.  The next two most popular parties were the SP (27.6%), and the FDP (7%) .

The entire Swiss population is generally well educated.  In Buch about 64% of the population (between age 25–64) have completed either non-mandatory upper secondary education or additional higher education (either university or a Fachhochschule). In Buch, 0.66% of the population is attending kindergarten or another pre-school, 4.32% are attending a Primary School, 4.65% attend a lower level Secondary School, and 4.98% attend a higher level Secondary School.

, 15% of the population belonged to the Roman Catholic Church and 51.9% belonged to the Swiss Reformed Church.

The historical population is given in the following table:

Economy and Infrastructure
Buch has an unemployment rate of 0.71%.  , there were 28 people employed in the primary economic sector and about 11 businesses involved in this sector.  6 people are employed in the secondary sector and there are 4 businesses in this sector.  60 people are employed in the tertiary sector, with 7 businesses in this sector.

 the mid year average unemployment rate was 0.9%.  There were 9 non-agrarian businesses in the municipality and 21.1% of the (non-agrarian) population was involved in the secondary sector of the economy while 78.9% were involved in the third.  At the same time, 78.9% of the working population was employed full-time, and 21.1% was employed part-time.  There were 19 residents of the municipality were employed in some capacity, of which females made up 26.3% of the workforce.   there were 43 residents who worked in the municipality, while 85 residents worked outside Buch and 9 people commuted into the municipality for work.

, there is 1 restaurant in Buch and the hospitality industry employs 2 people.

References

External links

 

Municipalities of the canton of Schaffhausen